Lui Olesk (12 October 1876 Kavastu Parish (now Luunja Parish), Kreis Dorpat – 19 February 1932 Tartu) was an Estonian politician. He was a member of the I Riigikogu, representing the Estonian Labour Party.

In 1919 he was Minister of Justice.

References

1876 births
1932 deaths
People from Luunja Parish
People from Kreis Dorpat
Estonian Labour Party politicians
Government ministers of Estonia
Members of the Estonian Constituent Assembly
Members of the Riigikogu, 1920–1923
University of Tartu alumni